The Third Wisconsin Legislature convened from January 9, 1850, to February 11, 1850, in regular session. Senators representing even numbered districts were newly elected for this session and were serving the first year of a two-year term.  Senators representing odd numbered districts were serving the second year of their two-year term.

Major events

 January 7, 1850: Second Inauguration of Nelson Dewey as Governor of Wisconsin
 January 7, 1850: Inauguration of Samuel Beall as Lieutenant Governor of Wisconsin
 July 9, 1850: U.S. President Zachary Taylor died in office; Vice President Millard Fillmore became the 13th President of the United States.

Major legislation

 January 30, 1850: An act for the division of the county of Racine and the erection of the county of Kenosha, 1850 Act 39

Party summary

Senate summary

Assembly summary

Sessions
 1st Regular session: January 9, 1850February 11, 1850

Leaders

Senate leadership
 President of the Senate: Samuel Beall, Lieutenant Governor

Assembly leadership
 Speaker of the Assembly: Moses M. Strong

Members

Members of the Senate
Members of the Wisconsin Senate for the Third Wisconsin Legislature (19):

Members of the Assembly
Members of the Assembly for the Third Wisconsin Legislature (66):

Employees

Senate employees
 Chief Clerk: William Rudolph Smith
 Sergeant-at-Arms: James Hanrahan

Assembly employees
 Chief Clerk: Alexander T. Gray
 Sergeant-at-Arms: E. R. Hugunin

References

External links
 Acts and Resolves Passed by the Legislature of Wisconsin in the Year 1850

1850 in Wisconsin
Wisconsin
Wisconsin legislative sessions